Gary Auerbach is an American television and film writer, director and producer. He graduated from Livingston High School and the University of Delaware, where he earned a degree in Economics. 

His first job in entertainment was as a film editor at EMC a trailer house in New York City. He then began to work at MTV where he produced several shows, including Jon Stewart's You Wrote You Watch It, the live Hangin with MTV, and the Peabody Award-winning Decade.

In 1995, he moved to Los Angeles where he executive produced MTV’s dating show “Singled Out” starring Chris Hardwick and Jenny McCarthy.

In 1996, he wrote and directed the feature film Just Your Luck. In 1997, he founded “Mindless Entertainment” with then-partner Mark Cronin. Mindless's initial production slate included The X Show and The New Movie Show with Chris Gore.

In 2002, Auerbach founded Go Go Luckey Entertainment with his wife, Julie Auerbach. The company broke out to mainstream success with Laguna Beach: The Real Orange County, which created a completely new genre of reality television; Jockeys, Brad Meltzer’s Decoded, and Paranormal State, among others.

Auerbach left Go Go Luckey in 2013 to oversee Wilshire Studios for NBC Universal. There he oversaw productions of The Soup, Fashion Police, Baggage on the Run, and Live from the Red Carpet.  Go Go Luckey was sold to Eclipse Television in 2015.

In 2015, he began producing under a new banner, Auerbach Entertainment, that had a first look deal with Gail Berman’s The Jackal Group. 

Under Auerbach Entertainment he has a documentary for Oxygen, King of Diamonds, as well as several other projects in development.

Productions

 Alectrixs
 American Haunting
 Brad Meltzer’s Decoded
 Deep Fried
 Eden’s World
 Exorcist Files
 Fashionista Diaries
 Ghost Lab
 Hampton High
 Hangar 1
 Jockeys
 Just Your Luck
 Karoake Superstars
 Kidnapped
 Laguna Beach: The Real Orange County
 Lost Tapes
 Nashville
 Newport Beach: The Real Orange County
 Paradise City
 Paranormal State
 Pretty Hurts
 Punk’d
 Roller Girls
 Singled Out
 The Great American Christmas
 The New Movie Show with Chris Gore
 The Occupants
 The X Show

References

Year of birth missing (living people)
Living people
University of Delaware alumni
American television producers